The 2017 Belgian Super Cup was a football match that took place on 22 July 2017 between Anderlecht, winners of the 2016–17 Belgian First Division A and Zulte Waregem, winners of the 2016–17 Belgian Cup. For the first time in Belgian football, a video assistant referee was used to review decisions during the match.

Match

Details

See also
2016–17 Belgian First Division A
2016–17 Belgian Cup

References

2017
Supercup
July 2017 sports events in Europe
Anderlecht
R.S.C. Anderlecht matches
S.V. Zulte Waregem matches